Parviturbo comptus is a species of sea snail, a marine gastropod mollusk in the family Skeneidae.

Description
The size of the shell attains 2.3 mm.

Distribution
This species occurs in the Caribbean Sea off Mexico and off the West Indies (Curacao, Puerto Rico)

References

 Woodring, W. P. 1928. Miocene Mollusks from Bowden, Jamaica. Part II. Gastropods and discussion of results. Carnegie Institute of Washington Publication 385: vii + 564 pp., 40 pls.

External links
 To Encyclopedia of Life
 To ITIS
 To World Register of Marine Species

comptus
Gastropods described in 1928